The 93rd Division was created in February 1949 under the Regulation of the Redesignations of All Organizations and Units of the Army, issued by Central Military Commission on November 1, 1948,. basing on the 39th Division, 13th Column of the Huadong Field Army. Its history can be traced to the New 7th Division, Jiaodong Military District, formed in August 1947.

The division was part of the 31st Corps. Under the flag of the 93rd Division, it was engaged in several major battles in the Chinese Civil War, including the Huaihai Campaign and Shanghai Campaign.

In July 1950, Artillery Regiment, 93rd Division was activated, which was later renamed as 373rd Artillery Regiment in 1953.

In April 1960 the division was renamed as 93rd Army Division. It was then composed of:
277th Regiment
278th Regiment
279th Regiment
373rd Artillery Regiment

In June 1969, the 373rd Artillery Regiment was renamed the Artillery Regiment, 93rd Army Division.

In 1985, the division was renamed as 93rd Infantry Division() and reconstituted as a southern training division:
279th Regiment was disbanded;
253rd Regiment was attached from the disbanding 85th Army Division.

The division was then composed of:
277th Infantry Regiment - training unit
278th Infantry Regiment - training unit
253rd Infantry Regiment
Artillery Regiment - training unit

In 1989 the division was reconstituted as a southern infantry division, category B.

In 1996 the division was transferred to the People's Armed Police and reconstituted as the 93rd Armed Police Mobile Division(). Artillery Regiment, 93rd Infantry Division was reconstituted as the 710th Regiment.

Since then the division was composed of:
Divisional Headquarters - PAP Unit 8710 - Putian, Fujian
277th Armed Police Regiment - PAP Unit 8712 - Putian, Fujian
278th Armed Police Regiment - PAP Unit 8713 - Putian, Fujian
253rd Armed Police Regiment - PAP Unit 8711 - Putian, Fujian
710th Armed Police Regiment - PAP Unit 8714 - Hui'an, Fujian

In 2017 the division was disbanded and absorbed into the 5th Detachment of the 2nd Armed Police Mobile Contingency

References

中国人民解放军各步兵师沿革, http://blog.sina.com.cn/s/blog_a3f74a990101cp1q.html

Units and formations of the People's Armed Police